Agar Graduates constituency is one of the 8 graduates seats and one of 100 Legislative Council seats in Uttar Pradesh. This constituency covers Agra, Firozabad, Mathura, Aligarh, Hathras, Etah, Mainpuri, Etawah, Kannauj, Auraiya, Kasganj and
Farrukhabad districts.

Member of Legislative Council

See also

Uttar Pradesh Legislative Council

References 

Politics of Agra district
Graduates constituencies in India